Ibresi (Yĕpreś) is an urban-type settlement and the administrative center of Ibresinsky District, Chuvashia, Russia. Population:

References

Notes

Sources

Urban-type settlements in Chuvashia
Buinsky Uyezd